Thomas J. Walsh (c. 1892 – October 9, 1955) was an American lawyer and politician from New York.

Life
Walsh was a member of the New York State Senate (24th D.) from 1925 to 1928, sitting in the 148th, 149th, 150th and 151st New York State Legislatures.

He was District Attorney of Richmond County from 1932 to 1936; a Municipal Justice from 1937 to 1944; and a judge of the Richmond County Court from 1944 until his death in 1955.

He died on October 9, 1955, at his home at 1031 Gordon Street in Stapleton, Staten Island.

References

1890s births
1955 deaths
Democratic Party New York (state) state senators
New York (state) state court judges
Richmond County District Attorneys
20th-century American judges
Politicians from Staten Island
20th-century American politicians